Awards and decorations of the Bangladesh Liberation War were decorations which were bestowed by the major warring parties during the years of the Bangladesh Liberation War. Bangladesh, India and Pakistan all issued awards and decorations during the conflict.

A listing of the medals bestowed after the Bangladesh War of Liberation are as follows:

Bangladesh

Gallantry awards

A total of 677 participants of the Bangladesh War of Independence received gallantry awards for their service and bravery. Four categories of gallantry awards were created after the war in Bangladesh. These were:
  Bir Sreshtho
The Bir Sreshtho (Valiant of Courage), is the highest military award of Bangladesh. It was awarded to seven freedom fighters who showed utmost bravery and died in action for their nation. They are considered martyrs.

Recipients
All the recipients of this award were killed in action during the Bangladesh War of Independence in 1971. The award was published by the Bangladesh Gazette on 15 December 1973. It is the highest military award of Bangladesh, similar to the U.S.  Medal of Honor or the UK's Victoria Cross. It has only been given in 1973 to seven people. Listed below are the people who have received the Bir Srestho medal. They are all considered 'Shaheed' (Martyrs).
  Captain Mohiuddin Jahangir  
  Sepoy Hamidur Rahman   
  Sepoy Mostafa Kamal 
  Engineroom Artificer Ruhul Amin  
  Flight Lieutenant Matiur Rahman  
  Lance Naik Munshi Abdur Rouf  
  Lance Naik Nur Mohammad Sheikh
 
  Bir Uttom ( ccValiant of Courage)

Recipients

  Bir Bikrom ( Valiant hero)
A total of 175 fighters have been awarded on 15 December 1973 for their heroic actions at the Liberation War of Bangladesh in 1971. The government of Bangladesh declared the name of the awardees in Bangladesh Gazette on 15 December 1973.
  Bir Protik ( Idol of Courage)
This award was officially declared on 15 December 1973 through Bangladesh Gazette. A total of 426 people have received the award so far, all for their actions during the liberation war of Bangladesh in 1971.

Liberation War medals

Civilian awards

  Independence Day Award

The Independence Day Award, also termed Independence Award, Swadhinata Padak, and Swadhinata Puroskar, is the highest state award given by the government of Bangladesh. Introduced in 1977, this award is bestowed upon Bangladeshi citizens or organisations in recognition of substantial contribution to one of many fields, including the War of Liberation, the language movement, education, literature, journalism, public service, science and technology, medical science, social science, song, games and sports, fine arts, rural development, and other areas.
  Bangladesh Freedom Honour -( Bānglādēśa sbādhīnatā sam'mānanā); posthumously conferred on former Indian prime minister Indira Gandhi.
  Bangladesh Liberation War Honour -( Bānglādēśa muktiyud'dha sam'mānanā); conferred to heads of states and heads of governments:
  King Jigme Dorji Wangchuck
  President Fidel Castro
  President Pranab Mukherjee
  Prime Minister Inder Kumar Gujral.
  Prime Minister Atal Bihari Vajpayee
  President Ram Baran Yadav
  Prime Minister/ Acting Head of state Girija Prasad Koirala
  Prime Minister Bishweshwar Prasad Koirala
  General Secretary Leonid IIyich Brezhnev
  President Nikolai Viktorovich Podgorny
  Prime Minister Alexei Nikolaevich Kosygin
  Prime Minister Sir Edward Richard George Heath
  President Marshal Josip Broz Tito

 Friends of Liberation War Honour -( Muktiyud'dha maitrī sam'mānanā); conferred to individuals, six organisations and Mitra Bahini. The individuals include 257 Indians, 88 Americans, 41 Pakistanis, 39 Britons, nine Russians, 18 Nepalese, 16 French and 18 Japanese. Three ceremonies were held between March 2012 and October 2012.

India

  Param Vir Chakra
Recipients of the Param Vir Chakra:

  Maha Vir Chakra
Recipients

  Vir Chakra

Recipients

|-
| 13
| 2/LT
| David A Devadasan
| Indian Army - 1 MAHAR
| Battle of Harar Kalan
| 10/11 December 1971

Pakistan

  Nishan-i-Haider
Recipients of the Nishan-E-Haider:
 Major Muhammad Akram (posthumously)
 Pilot Officer Rashid Minhas (posthumously)
 Major Shabbir Sharif (posthumously)
 Sarwar Muhammad Hussain (posthumously)
 Lance Naik Muhammad Mahfuz (posthumously)

See also

 Liberation War of Bangladesh
 Bangladeshi honours system
 Military awards and decorations of Bangladesh

References 

Bangladesh and the Commonwealth of Nations
India and the Commonwealth of Nations
Pakistan and the Commonwealth of Nations
Military awards and decorations of Bangladesh
Military awards and decorations of India
Military awards and decorations of Pakistan
Bangladesh Liberation War